Chittagong University of Engineering & Technology, commonly referred to as CUET, is a public engineering university in Bangladesh located in Raozan Upazila under Chattogram District. Established in 1968, this university is a government funded autonomous self degree awarding institution, maintaining special emphasis on teaching and research of engineering, technology, architecture and planning under five faculties and seventeen academic departments.

Number of present students including undergraduate, graduate and post-graduate is around 4500 with 900 students graduating each year.

Location

CUET is situated in the district of Chittagong under Chittagong Division. It is in the Pahartali union under Raozan sub-district, by the north side of the Chittagong-Kaptai road about 20 kilometers from the center of Chittagong. The 420 Megawatt Raozan Thermal Power Plant is situated opposite to the campus. Karnaphuli Hydroelectric Power Station,  the largest source of hydroelectricity of the country, is situated in Kaptai, about 25 kilometers from CUET.

History

To meet the increasing demand of professional engineers for the national development, the National Economic Council of the Government of Pakistan decided to establish The Engineering College, Chittagong on August 28, 1962. The Engineering College, Chittagong, started functioning on December 28, 1968, by admitting 120 students in its first academic session under the faculty of Engineering, University of Chittagong. On 1 July 1986, through a Government Ordinance (No. XXI, 1986) the college was converted into an autonomous institution called Bangladesh Institute of Technology (BIT), Chittagong. There were three other similar BITs in Khulna, Rajshahi and Dhaka. The President of Bangladesh was the visitor of these institutes. A Board of Governors headed by a Chairman appointed by the President was the policy-making and administrative authority which had its head office at Tejgaon, Dhaka. Though the BIT, Chittagong was said to be an autonomous institution there was various complexity in the administration, control, budget, admission, development and other processes of the institution. On September 1, 2003, it was a historic moment when the BIT, Chittagong was converted into a fully autonomous public university and named Chittagong University of Engineering and Technology or CUET for short, after the teachers and students of BIT, Chittagong started huge movement demanding university status for all four BITs. The honorable President of Bangladesh is the Chancellor of the University.
BIT, Khulna; BIT, Rajshahi and BIT, Dhaka have been converted to Khulna University of Engineering and Technology (KUET), Rajshahi University of Engineering and Technology (RUET), and Dhaka University of Engineering and Technology (DUET) respectively. The first day of September is celebrated as CUET day or University day by the university.

At present, the university is a fully autonomous statutory organization of the Government of Bangladesh which awards degrees itself to the graduates. There are various statutory bodies like syndicate, academic council, finance committee, planning, and development committee, academic committees, etc. for policy and decision-making on aspects of the university under the framework of the Act.

Campus
The university campus covers an area of 188 Acres. The campus of CUET is landscaped around a valley with hilly areas and plant varieties making the campus a natural arboretum. Facilities include academic buildings, administration building, auditorium, library, computer center, teachers-students center, ICT Business incubator,  workshops, research laboratories, halls of residence, teachers' quarter, canteens and central mosque. The university has inside its boundaries a bank, a post office, three canteens, two galleries for holding conference, a two-storied central mosque having a floor area of 560 square meters, and two mini-mart for general needs.

Medical Center
The University Medical Center is equipped for primary care, quarantine, sickbed exam appearance, few diagnostics but serious cases are referred to a local hospital 10 kilometers away or to the city hospital. As present, construction of a new building for the medical center is underway.

Transportation 
The university runs its own regular bus service to and from the city for benefit of the students residing there, every office day. Friday and Saturday are weekly holidays. Currently 11 buses are available for students and staffs of the university.

Sports and entertainment 
The university provides facilities for football, hockey, cricket, volleyball, basketball, table tennis etc. The students play tennis, badminton and other games as well. Sports meets and games competitions are features of campus life. The students arrange debate, cultural show, indoor games competition etc.

Library
There are two libraries in CUET. Multiple copies of textbooks are available. The library has more than 52,000 books and thousands of journals and periodicals in its collection. The daily newspaper and monthly magazines are also available.

Halls of residence

There are five men's and two women's dormitories.

University School and College
CUET has a university school and college named Chittagong Engineering University School and College inside its campus, intended to provide secondary and higher secondary education for the children of university staffs which also receives general students.

Administration

Chancellor
 President Abdul Hamid

Vice-Chancellor
 Mohammad Rafiqul Alam

Registrar
 Faruque-Uz-Zaman Chowdhury (Additional Charge)

List of vice-chancellors 

 Mohammad Rafiqul Alam (present)

Academics

Academic programs
The university offers degrees in engineering disciplines in undergraduate and post-graduate levels and also conducts research and provides degrees in basic sciences in post-graduate level.

Institutes and centers

Rankings
According to the Webometrics Ranking of World Universities (also known as Ranking Web of Universities), CUET was ranked 11th among universities in Bangladesh and 1297th among continental universities in January 2019.

Research and publication
The university has a motto to make itself as 'A center of excellence'. For promoting research, the university established a distinct institute namely 'Research and Extension'.
International Conferences organized by CUET:
International Conference on Advances in Civil Engineering (ICACE) organized by Department of Civil Engineering, CUET
International Conference on Mechanical Engineering and Renewable Energy (ICMERE) organized by Department of Mechanical Engineering, CUET
International Conference on Electrical, Computer and Communication Engineering (ECCE) organized by faculty of Electrical and Computer Engineering (ECE)

Calendar
After the publication of admission test result, selected students are admitted in Level-1 (academic year). Each Level is divided into three terms. Term-I and Term-II are composed of 18 weeks and Short Term composed of 3 weeks. Each week consists of five working days. A student can register for the next Level after completion of all three Terms. A Bachelor course in Engineering consists of four Levels and a Bachelor of Architecture course consists of five Levels. A Term final examination is held at the end of Term-I and II besides class tests examination for continuous assessment of progress.

Students can clear any backlog or incomplete courses in the Short Term exam.
At least 155 credit hours must be earned to be eligible for a bachelor's degree in Engineering. The candidate is awarded Honors if he/she obtains CGPA above 3.75 or higher and awarded Chancellor's award if CGPA is 4.0.

Medium of instruction
The language of instruction is English, which is the official language for examinations.

Admissions and costs

Admissions
The Undergraduate admission test is one of the most intensive written examinations in Bangladesh. After completion of higher secondary education or A level, a student can submit her or his application for undergraduate admission if he/she fulfills the minimum requirements. According to the admission process till 2019, students with the best grades in Mathematics, Physics, and Chemistry of their higher secondary examination were allowed to sit in the admission test. The screening process used to allow 10,000 students to sit for the admission test, based on the cumulative sum of grade points in these four subjects. Students had to sit only for the written test in admission. They had to seat for an additional free-hand drawing test in order to get admitted in architecture. After the admission test, only about 890 students got admitted. From 2020, three public engineering universities in Bangladesh, CUET along with KUET and RUET took a combined admission test to select students for all three of them. Around 30,000 students competed in the admission test for 3201 seats in three universities combined.

For admission to Masters and Postgraduate programs, candidates are required to appear in interviews and/or written tests.

Expenses
For international students, $500 is to be paid per semester as registration fees. The university also provides scholarship on the basis of their merit.

Sheikh Kamal IT Business Incubator 
The Bangladesh Hi-Tech Park Authority (BHTPA) established an ICT business incubator inside Chittagong University of Engineering and Technology. 25 acres of land was provided to the Ministry of Posts, Telecommunications and Information Technology and BHTPA inside the university campus by CUET authority.  The project was approved by the economic department of BHTPA on 8 November 2012. It is now awaiting its inauguration.

See also

 Bangladesh University of Engineering and Technology
 Bangladesh University of Textiles
 University of Dhaka
 Khulna University of Engineering & Technology
 Rajshahi University of Engineering & Technology
 Dhaka University of Engineering & Technology
 List of Universities in Bangladesh

References

External links
 Official CUET website

Educational institutions established in 1968
1968 establishments in East Pakistan
Universities and colleges in Chittagong
Technological institutes of Bangladesh
Public engineering universities of Bangladesh
Engineering universities and colleges in Bangladesh